"The Sound of White" is the fourth and final single released from Australian singer-songwriter Missy Higgins' first album, The Sound of White (2004). It was released on 15 August 2005 and peaked at number 22 on the Australian ARIA Singles Chart.

Track listing
Australian CD single
 "The Sound of White" – 4:52	
 "Unbroken" – 3:42	
 "Hold Me Tight" – 3:49

Charts

References

2004 songs
2005 singles
Eleven: A Music Company singles
Missy Higgins songs
Songs written by Missy Higgins